Cyperus cristulatus is a sedge of the family Cyperaceae that is native to the  Kimberley region of Western Australia, the Northern Territory and Queensland.

See also
List of Cyperus species

References

Plants described in 1940
Flora of Western Australia
cristulatus
Flora of the Northern Territory
Flora of Queensland
Taxa named by Stanley Thatcher Blake